Massachusetts House of Representatives' 2nd Barnstable district in the United States is one of 160 legislative districts included in the lower house of the Massachusetts General Court. It covers part of Barnstable County. Democrat Kip Diggs of Osterville has represented the district since 2021.

Towns represented
The district includes the following localities:
 part of Barnstable
 part of Yarmouth

The current district geographic boundary overlaps with that of the Massachusetts Senate's Cape and Islands district.

Former locales
The district previously covered:
 Brewster, circa 1872, 1927 
 Chatham, circa 1927 
 Dennis, circa 1872, 1927 
 Eastham, circa 1927 
 Harwich, circa 1872, 1927 
 Orleans, circa 1927 
 Provincetown, circa 1927 
 Truro, circa 1927 
 Wellfleet, circa 1927

Representatives
 John W. Atwood, circa 1858 
 Thomas Dodge, circa 1858 
 Luther Studley, circa 1858 
 Nathaniel Doane, Jr, circa 1859 
 James S. Howes, circa 1859 
 Benjamin H. Matthews, circa 1859 
 Joseph W. Rogers, circa 1888 
 Erastus T. Bearse, circa 1920 
 Oscar Josiah Cahoon, circa 1951 
 Howard C. Cahoon, Jr., circa 1975 
 Demetrius Atsalis, 1999-2013
 Brian Mannal, 2013-2017
 William L. Crocker, Jr., 2017-2020 
Kip Diggs, 2021-present

See also
 List of Massachusetts House of Representatives elections
 Other Barnstable County districts of the Massachusetts House of Representatives: 1st, 3rd, 4th, 5th; Barnstable, Dukes and Nantucket
 List of Massachusetts General Courts
 List of former districts of the Massachusetts House of Representatives

Images

References

Further reading

External links
 Ballotpedia. Massachusetts House of Representatives Second Barnstable District
  (State House district information based on U.S. Census Bureau's American Community Survey).
 League of Women Voters of the Cape Cod Area

House
Government of Barnstable County, Massachusetts